The 2014 Open GDF Suez Seine-et-Marne was a professional tennis tournament played on indoor hard courts. It was the second edition of the tournament and part of the 2014 ITF Women's Circuit, offering a total of $50,000 in prize money. It took place in Croissy-Beaubourg, France, on 24–30 March 2014.

Singles main draw entrants

Seeds 

 1 Rankings as of 17 March 2014

Other entrants 
The following players received wildcards into the singles main draw:
  Alix Collombon
  Océane Dodin
  Myrtille Georges
  Lyudmyla Kichenok

The following players received entry from the qualifying draw:
  Elizaveta Kulichkova
  Sofia Shapatava
  Tereza Smitková
  Jasmina Tinjić

Champions

Singles 

  Claire Feuerstein def.  Renata Voráčová 6–3, 4–6, 6–4

Doubles 

  Margarita Gasparyan /  Lyudmyla Kichenok def.  Kristina Barrois /  Eleni Daniilidou 6–2, 6–4

External links 
 2014 Open GDF Suez Seine-et-Marne at ITFtennis.com
 Official website 

2014 ITF Women's Circuit
2014
2014 in French tennis